The 2023 Pac-12 Conference football season will be the 45th season of Pac-12 football taking place during the 2023 NCAA Division I FBS football season. The season will begin on  August 26, 2023, and will end with the 2023 Pac-12 Championship Game on December 1, 2022, at Allegiant Stadium in Paradise, Nevada.

The Pac-12 is a Power Five Conference under the College Football Playoff format along with the Atlantic Coast Conference, the Big 12 Conference, Big Ten Conference, and the Southeastern Conference.

The 2023 season will be the second since the conference expanded to 12 teams in 2011 in which Pac-12 teams are not split into divisions. It will be the final season with UCLA and USC, who will be leaving to join the Big Ten Conference following the 2023–24 academic year.

Previous season
The Utah Utes defeated the USC Trojans 47–24 in the Pac-12 Football Championship Game.

Seven teams participated in bowl games, finishing with a record of 3–4.  Oregon State defeated Florida 30–3 in the Las Vegas Bowl.  Washington State lost to Fresno State 29–6 in the Los Angeles Bowl.  Oregon defeated North Carolina 28–27 in the Holiday Bowl.  Washington defeated Texas 27–20 in the Alamo Bowl.  UCLA lost to Pitt 37–35 in the Sun Bowl.  USC lost to Tulane 46–45 in the Cotton Bowl.  Utah lost to Penn State 35–21 in the Rose Bowl.

Preseason
2023 Pac-12 Spring Football and number of signees on signing day:

Arizona – 22
Arizona State – 17
California – 10
Colorado – 18
Oregon – 27
Oregon State – 18
Stanford – 16
UCLA – 14
USC – 20
Utah – 20
Washington – 20
Washington State – 22

Recruiting classes

Pac-12 Media Days
The Pac-12 will conduct its 2023 Pac-12 media day in July 21st, 2023, at a location TBD in Las Vegas, NV.

The teams and representatives in respective order were as follows:

 Pac-12 Commissioner – George Kliavkoff
 Arizona – Jedd Fisch (HC)
 Arizona State – Kenny Dillingham (HC)
 California – Justin Wilcox (HC)
 Colorado – Deion Sanders (HC)
 Oregon – Dan Lanning  (HC)
 Oregon State – Jonathan Smith (HC)
 Stanford – Troy Taylor (HC)
 UCLA – Chip Kelly (HC)
 USC – Lincoln Riley (HC)
 Utah – Kyle Whittingham (HC)
 Washington – Kalen DeBoer (HC)
 Washington State – Jake Dickert (HC)

Preseason Media polls
The preseason polls will be  released in July 2023. Since 1992, the credentialed media has gotten the preseason champion correct just five times. Only nine times has the preseason pick even made it to the Pac-12 title game. Below are the results of the media poll with total points received next to each school and first-place votes in parentheses.

Preseason awards

All−American Teams

Individual awards

Preseason All Pac-12
Sources: 

First Team

Second Team

All Pac–12 Honorable Mention (received votes from four or more members of the media): 
Arizona:
Arizona State:
California:
Colorado:
Oregon:
Oregon State:
Stanford:
UCLA:
USC:
Utah:
Washington:
Washington State:

Head coaches

Coaching changes
There was three coaching changes before the 2023 season.  On November 27, 2022 Arizona State hired Kenny Dillingham as the 26th head coach in team history.  On December 3, 2022 Colorado hired Deion Sanders as the 28th head coach in team history  On December 11, 2022 Troy Taylor was hired as 35th head coach in program history.

Coaches
Note: All stats current through the completion of the 2022 season

Note:

Rankings

Schedules

All times Pacific time.  Pac-12 teams in bold.

† denotes Homecoming game

Rankings reflect those of the AP poll for weeks 1 through 9.  Rankings from Week 10 until the end of the Season reflect those of the College Football Playoff Rankings.

Regular season
The regular season is scheduled to begin on August 26, 2023, and end on December 1, 2023.

Week 0

Week 1

Week 2

Week 3

Week 4

Week 5

Week 6

Week 7

Week 8

Week 9

Week 10

Week 11

Week 12

Week 13

Pac-12 Championship Game

The Pac-12 Championship Game, will be the conference's twelve championship game, will be played on December 1, 2023, at the home stadium of the Las Vegas Raiders at Allegiant Stadium in Paradise, Nevada.  Starting in 2022, the two teams with the highest conference winning percentage will face off in the championship game.

Postseason

Bowl games

For the 2020–2025 bowl cycle, The Pac-12 will have annually seven appearances in the following bowls: Rose Bowl (unless they are selected for playoffs filled by a Pac-12 team if champion is in the playoffs), LA Bowl, Las Vegas Bowl, Alamo Bowl, Holiday Bowl, and Sun Bowl. The Pac-12 teams will go to a New Year's Six bowl if a team finishes higher than the champions of Power Five conferences in the final College Football Playoff rankings. The Pac-12 champion are also eligible for the College Football Playoff if they're among the top four teams in the final CFP ranking.

 

Rankings are from CFB Rankings.  All times Pacific Time Zone. Pac-12 teams shown in bold.†CFP semifinal game

Selection of teams
Bowl eligible: 
Bowl-ineligible:

Head to head matchups

This table summarizes the head-to-head results between teams in conference play.

Updated with the results of all games through August 2023.

Pac-12 records vs Other Conferences
2023–2024 records against non-conference foes:

Regular Season

Post Season

Pac-12 vs Power Five matchups
The following games include Pac-12 teams competing against Power Five conference teams from the ACC, Big Ten, Big 12,  and SEC, plus independent Notre Dame (an ACC member in non-football sports). All rankings are from the AP Poll at the time of the game.

Pac-12 vs Group of Five matchups
The following games include Pac-12 teams competing against teams from the American, C-USA, MAC, Mountain West or Sun Belt.

Pac-12 vs FBS independents matchups
The following games include Pac-12 teams competing against FBS Independents, which includes Army, UConn or UMass.

Pac-12 vs FCS matchups
The Football Championship Subdivision comprises 13 conferences and two independent programs.

Note:† Denotes Neutral Site Game

Awards and honors

Player of the week honors

Totals per school

Pac-12 individual awards
The following individuals received postseason honors as voted by the Pac-12 Conference football coaches at the end of the season

All-conference teams
The following players earned All-Pac-12 honors. Any teams showing (_) following their name are indicating the number of All-Pac-12 Conference Honors awarded to that university for 1st team and 2nd team respectively.

Source:

First Team

Second Team

Notes:
 RS = Return Specialist
 AP/ST = All-Purpose/Special Teams Player (not a kicker or returner)
 † Two-time first team selection;
 ‡ Three-time first team selection

Honorable mentions
ARIZONA: 
ARIZONA STATE:
CALIFORNIA:
COLORADO:
OREGON: 
OREGON STATE: 
STANFORD: 
UCLA: 
USC: 
UTAH: 
WASHINGTON: 
WASHINGTON STATE:

All-Americans

Currently, the NCAA compiles consensus all-America teams in the sports of Division I-FBS football and Division I men's basketball using a point system computed from All-America teams named by coaches associations or media sources.  The system consists of three points for a first-team honor, two points for second-team honor, and one point for third-team honor.  Honorable mention and fourth team or lower recognitions are not accorded any points.  College Football All-American consensus teams are compiled by position and the player accumulating the most points at each position is named first team consensus all-American.  Currently, the NCAA recognizes All-Americans selected by the AP, AFCA, FWAA, TSN, and the WCFF to determine Consensus and Unanimous All-Americans. Any player named to the First Team by all five of the NCAA-recognized selectors is deemed a Unanimous All-American.

Fourth Team:
 

Sources:
*American Football Coaches Association All-America Team
*AP All-America team
*The Athletic All-America Team
*CBS Sports All-America Team
*Phil Steele's 2022 Postseason All-American Team
*ESPN All-America Team
*FWAA All-America Team
*Sporting News All-America Team
*USA Today All-America Team
*Walter Camp All-America Team

National award winners
2023 College Football Award Winners

Home game attendance

Bold – At or Exceed capacity
†Season High

References